Jasper Pheasant  was an Anglican priest in Ireland in the seventeenth century.

Pheasant was educated at Trinity College, Dublin. He was ordained deacon on 1 March 1640 and priest on 18 June 1680. He was Precentor of Achonry from 1661 and Dean of Killaloe from 1662, holding both positions until his death in 1692.

Notes

Alumni of Trinity College Dublin
Deans of Killaloe
17th-century Irish Anglican priests
1692 deaths
Year of birth missing